Kleine Schweimke is a small river of Lower Saxony, Germany. It flows into the Große Schweimke southeast of Osterode am Harz.

See also
List of rivers of Lower Saxony

Rivers of Lower Saxony
Rivers of Germany